Cupeño is an extinct Uto-Aztecan language, formerly spoken by the Cupeño people of Southern California, United States. Roscinda Nolasquez (d. 1987) was the last native speaker of Cupeño. The Cupeño people now speak English. The native name Kupangaxwicham means 'people from the sleeping place' referring to their traditional homeland, prior to 1902, of Ktipa (at the base of Warner's Hot Springs). A smaller village was located to the south of Ktipa, named Wildkalpa. 

Throughout the 1890s it was debated whether or not the Cupeño peoples should be allowed to continue living on traditional Cupeño territory. After many years of public protests the California Supreme Court decided to relocate the Cupeño people to the Pala Reservation.

Cupeño has linguistic influence from both the languages that preceded it and the Yuman-speaking Ipai, who share their southern border.

Region
The language was originally spoken in Cupa, Wilaqalpa, and Paluqla, San Diego County, California, and later around the Pala Indian Reservation.

Morphology
Cupeño is an agglutinative language, where words use suffix complexes for a variety of purposes with several morphemes strung together. Cupeño is dominantly head-final, with a mostly strict word order (SOV) for some constituents, e.g. genitive-noun constructions. But some contexts allow departure from the SOV word order, this may include shifting verbs to be the initial part of a sentence or moving arguments to follow verbs.

Nouns 
Nouns (as well as demonstratives, determiners, quantifiers, and adjectives) in Cupeño are marked for case and number and agree with each other in complex nominal constructions.

Verbs 
Cupeño inflects its verbs for transitivity, tense, aspect, mood, person, number, and evidentiality.

Evidentiality is expressed in Cupeño with clitics, which generally appear near the beginning of the sentence.
=kuʼut 'reportative' (mu=kuʼut 'and it is said that...')
=am 'mirative' 
=$he 'dubitative'

There are two inflected moods, realis =pe and irrealis =eʼp.

Tense-Aspect system 
Future simple verbs are unmarked. Past simple verbs have past-tense pronouns; past imperfect add the imperfect modifier shown below.

Pronouns
The pronominals of Cupeño appear in many different forms and structures. The following appear attached only to past-tense verbs.

Phonology

Vowels

 may reduce to schwa in unstressed syllables.

 is also realized as  before uvulars.

Consonants

Lexicon

See also

Survey of California and Other Indian Languages

References

External links
, Four Directions Institute
Cupeño language, Survey of California and Other Indian Languages
OLAC resources in and about the Cupeño language

Cupeno
Takic
Takic languages
Extinct languages of North America
Languages extinct in the 1980s